The superior lateral cutaneous nerve of arm (or superior lateral brachial cutaneous nerve) is the continuation of the posterior branch of the axillary nerve, after it pierces the deep fascia. It contains axons from C5-C6 ventral rami.

Structure
It sweeps around the posterior border of the deltoideus and supplies the skin over the lower two-thirds of the posterior part of this muscle, as well as that covering the long head of the triceps brachii.

See also
 Posterior cutaneous nerve of arm (Posterior brachial)
 Medial cutaneous nerve of arm (Medial brachial)
 Lateral cutaneous nerve of forearm (Lateral antebrachial)

Additional images

References

External links
 Photo at mun.ca

Nerves of the upper limb